The 4th National Geographic Bee was held in Washington, D.C. on May 21, 1992, sponsored by the National Geographic Society. The final competition was moderated by Jeopardy! host Alex Trebek. The winner was Lawson Fite of Shumway Middle School in Vancouver, Washington, who won a $25,000 college scholarship. The 2nd-place winner, Geoffrey Hatchard of Cresco, Pennsylvania, won a $15,000 scholarship. The 3rd-place winner, Michael Sherback of North Easton, Massachusetts, won a $10,000 scholarship.

References

External links
 National Geographic Bee Official Website

National Geographic Bee